Saron is a town in the Western Cape province of South Africa.

A Mission Station can be found at the foot of the Saronsberg in the Tulbagh district, about 20 km south of Porterville. The Mission Station was established by the Rhenish Missionary Society in 1848 by Johannes Heinrich Kulpmann, for Mission Station Purposes only, it was later taken over by the Dutch Reformed Church in 1945. The name, Afrikaans for Sharon, is of biblical origin, meaning 'flats' or ‘plain’.

On 30 November 2013, Heritage Western Cape declared the historic core of the Saron Mission Station as a provincial heritage site.

Saron has its name written on the side of the Saronsberg which can be seen from an aerial view.

References

External links

5.  Purpose of Saron Mission Station.

Populated places in the Drakenstein Local Municipality
1848 establishments in the Cape Colony